The Coon Box Fork Bridge is a swinging suspension bridge located  southwest of Coon Box in Jefferson County, Mississippi. The bridge carries Coon Box Road across the North Fork Coles Creek. Constructed in 1919 for $3,498.99, the bridge has a wooden deck and concrete towers plated in iron. The bridge was one of many of the same type constructed in Jefferson County in the early 1900s to serve farmers in Coon Box; it is considered a "highly successful technological product" and is in fair condition. The bridge was added to the National Register of Historic Places on May 23, 1979. The bridge was destroyed in 2015.

References

External links

Road bridges on the National Register of Historic Places in Mississippi
Bridges completed in 1919
National Register of Historic Places in Jefferson County, Mississippi
Suspension bridges in the United States